"Uptown Festival" is the debut single by the band Shalamar, released on Soul Train Records in 1977. The song is a medley of ten Motown classics sung over a 1970s disco beat. The radio edit, "Uptown Festival (Part 1)", became a hit peaking at No. 25 on the Billboard Hot 100, No. 10 on the R&B chart and No. 2 on the Dance chart. It also charted internationally. After the success of the single, Dick Griffey, the booking agent for Soul Train, formed a vocal group, resulting in the first incarnation of Shalamar with Jody Watley, Jeffrey Daniels and Gary Mumford.

Recording and songs 
The medley "Uptown Festival" was recorded at Ike & Tina Turner's Bolic Sound studio in Inglewood in 1976. It features various session musicians, including Mike Lewis and Laurin Rinder from El Coco, and the Motown musicians, including Eddie "Bongo" Brown and Jack Ashford.

List of songs 

 "Going to a Go-Go" 
 "I Can't Help Myself (Sugar Pie Honey Bunch)" 
 "Uptight (Everything's Alright)"
 "Stop! In the Name of Love" 
 "It's the Same Old Song" 
 "The Tears of a Clown" 
 "Love Is Like an Itching in My Heart" 
 "This Old Heart of Mine (Is Weak for You)" 
 "Baby Love" 
 "He Was Really Saying Somethin'"

Chart performance

References 

1977 songs
1977 debut singles
Shalamar songs
Songs written by Smokey Robinson
Songs written by Bobby Rogers
Songs written by Marv Tarplin
Songs written by Warren "Pete" Moore
Songs written by Holland–Dozier–Holland
Songs written by Stevie Wonder
Songs written by Sylvia Moy
Songs written by Henry Cosby
Songs written by Norman Whitfield
Songs written by Eddie Holland
Songs written by William "Mickey" Stevenson
Music medleys